Daniel McKay is a Scottish professional footballer currently playing as a striker for Arthurlie in the Scottish Junior Football Association, West Region.

Career
McKay started his career at Kilmarnock and was named the first Clydesdale Bank under-19 League "Rising Star" of the 2009–10 Scottish Premier League season.

In December 2009, McKay had a one-month loan spell at Arbroath but made no appearances due to the inclement weather in Scotland.

McKay spent the first half of the 2010–11 season on loan at Ayr United, after a prior successful spell the previous season.  After his loan deal expired he was then sent on loan to Brechin City for the remainder of the season.

In January 2012, he was released by Kilmarnock and subsequently signed for Albion Rovers.

McKay joined Junior side Arthurlie in September 2012 before moving on to Beith Juniors in March the following year. He signed for Neilston Juniors in January 2015.

After a brief spell at Irvine Meadow, McKay signed for Troon on 11 January 2018.

Personal life
He is the brother of fellow footballer Barrie McKay.

References

External links
  (Ayr)
  (Kilmarnock and Brechin City)

Living people
1991 births
Scottish footballers
Ayr United F.C. players
Kilmarnock F.C. players
Arbroath F.C. players
Scottish Football League players
Scottish Junior Football Association players
Association football forwards
Brechin City F.C. players
Albion Rovers F.C. players
Arthurlie F.C. players
Beith Juniors F.C. players
Neilston Juniors F.C. players
Troon F.C. players
People from Barrhead
Sportspeople from East Renfrewshire